Tobias and the Angel is an altar painting, finished around 1470–1475, attributed to the workshop of the Italian Renaissance painter Andrea del Verrocchio. It is housed in the National Gallery, London. This painting is similar to an earlier painting depicting Tobias and the Angel, by Antonio del Pollaiuolo.

According to Oxford art historian Martin Kemp, Leonardo da Vinci, who was a member of Verrocchio's studio, may have painted some part of this work, most likely the fish.  David Alan Brown, of the National Gallery in Washington, attributes the painting of the fluffy little dog to him as well. If so, this would be perhaps the first extant example of a painting with input by Leonardo.

References

External links

1470s paintings
Paintings depicting Tobias
Paintings by Andrea del Verrocchio
Collections of the National Gallery, London
Paintings of Raphael (archangel)
Dogs in art
Fish in art